Bingham Creek is a  long 2nd order tributary to the Niobrara River in Knox County, Nebraska.

Course
Bingham Creek rises on the Bazile Creek divide about 1 mile south-southwest of Sparta, Nebraska and then flows generally northwest to join the Niobrara River about 1 mile southeast of Ponca, Nebraska.

Watershed
Bingham Creek drains  of area, receives about 24.5 in/year of precipitation, has a wetness index of 369.59, and is about 6.24% forested.

See also

List of rivers of Nebraska

References

Rivers of Knox County, Nebraska
Rivers of Nebraska